Ivan Oleksandrovych Kuts (born 20 January 2000) is a Ukrainian professional footballer who plays as a centre-forward for Ukrainian club Kremin Kremenchuk.

Career
In 2022 he moved back to Kremin Kremenchuk and in january 2023 he left the club with mutual agreement.

References

External links
 
 
 

2000 births
Living people
People from Kremenchuk
Ukrainian footballers
Association football forwards
FC Kremin Kremenchuk players
FC Nikopol players
FC Olimpiya Savyntsi players
Ukrainian First League players
Ukrainian Second League players
Ukrainian Amateur Football Championship players
Sportspeople from Poltava Oblast
21st-century Ukrainian people